Abeyratne Bandara Herath Pilapitiya (born 25 May 1925) (known as Abeyratne Pilapitiya) is a former Sri Lankan politician who served as the 3rd Governor of Uva and 2nd Chief Minister of Sabaragamuwa.

Pilapitiya was first elected to parliament in March 1960 general election from Kalawana representing the United National Party, he lost the July 1960 general election to L. de S.A. Gunasekera. He was re-elected in the 1965 general election. He lost his seat to Sarath Muttetuwegama in the 1970 general election. He was again re-elected in the 1977 general election, defeating Sarath Muttetuwegama, but lost his seat in 1980 due to an election petition.
 He was elected to Chief Minister of Sabaragamuwa in 1989 and served till 1993. He was then appointed Governor of Uva and served till 1994.

Pilapitiya was married to Maheswari, who predeceased him in October 2019.

References

Members of the 4th Parliament of Ceylon
Members of the 6th Parliament of Ceylon
Members of the 8th Parliament of Sri Lanka
Members of the Sabaragamuwa Provincial Council
Chief Ministers of Sabaragamuwa Province
Governors of Uva Province
Deputy ministers of Sri Lanka
1925 births
Living people